Stephen Dixon (born September 7, 1985) is a Canadian professional ice hockey centre currently playing for Glasgow Clan of the EIHL, whom he joined in 2022.

Playing career
A first round pick for Cape Breton Screaming Eagles (QMJHL) in the 2001 Midget Draft, the Halifax native played his entire junior career with Cape Breton, despite being traded to the Val-d'Or Foreurs before the start of the 2005 season.

Dixon was drafted in the seventh round, 229th overall, by the Pittsburgh Penguins in the 2003 NHL Entry Draft. He played all 80 games with the Wilkes-Barre Scranton penguins for the 2005–2006 and 2006–2007 season. The Penguins traded him to the Anaheim Ducks on June 23, 2007, in exchange for Tim Brent. He was assigned to the Portland Pirates. Dixon played in the KHL-team Amur Khabarovsk in the season 2010-2011. On August 29, 2011, Dixon moved for the second consecutive season within Europe to  sign a one year-contract with the Finnish club, Ässät of the SM-liiga.

During the 2012–13 season, Dixon transferred at the transfer deadline from Ässät to return to the KHL with Lokomotiv Yaroslavl on January 31, 2013.

Dixon was a member of the gold medal winning Canadian team at the 2005 World Junior Ice Hockey Championships.

He has since gone on to play for HC Yugra (KHL), Luleå HF (SHL), Tappara (Liiga), Grizzlys Wolfsburg (DEL) and Cardiff Devils (EIHL). 

In June 2022, Dixon left Cardiff for fellow Elite League side Glasgow Clan. He was named player-assistant coach, before assuming the interim head coach position after the departure of Clan coach Malcolm Cameron in October 2022.

Career statistics

Regular season and playoffs

International

References

External links
 

1985 births
Amur Khabarovsk players
Ässät players
Brynäs IF players
Canadian ice hockey centres
Cape Breton Screaming Eagles players
Cardiff Devils players
Glasgow Clan players
Ice hockey people from Nova Scotia
Living people
Lokomotiv Yaroslavl players
Luleå HF players
Pittsburgh Penguins draft picks
Portland Pirates players
Sportspeople from Halifax, Nova Scotia
Wilkes-Barre/Scranton Penguins players
Canadian expatriate ice hockey players in Scotland
Canadian expatriate ice hockey players in Wales
Canadian expatriate ice hockey players in Finland
Canadian expatriate ice hockey players in Russia
Canadian expatriate ice hockey players in Sweden
Canadian expatriate ice hockey players in the United States
Canadian expatriate ice hockey players in Germany
Canadian ice hockey coaches